Anwar Mediero Rodríguez (born 3 March 2002) is an Ethiopian footballer currently playing as a forward for Fursan Hispania.

Club career

Early career
Born in Addis Ababa, Ethiopia, Mediero was adopted by a Spanish mother at the age of one. After his adoptive family settled in Vigo, Mediero started his career with local side Victoria at the age of seven, before joining Celta a year later. After five years with Celta, he was poached by Barcelona, a move which was investigated by FIFA, leading to Barcelona being sanctioned and Mediero being suspended for a year.

A serious injury hindered his game time at La Masia, and in 2020 he moved to Italy to sign for Atalanta. In January 2022, he was loaned to Hellas Verona.

Fursan Hispania
In December 2022, Mediero moved to the United Arab Emirates to sign for First Division League side Fursan Hispania.

Career statistics

References

External links
 

2002 births
Living people
Sportspeople from Addis Ababa
Ethiopian footballers
Spanish footballers
Association football forwards
UAE First Division League players
RC Celta de Vigo players
FC Barcelona players
Atalanta B.C. players
Hellas Verona F.C. players
Ethiopian expatriate footballers
Spanish expatriate footballers
Spanish expatriate sportspeople in Italy
Expatriate footballers in Italy
Spanish expatriate sportspeople in the United Arab Emirates
Expatriate footballers in the United Arab Emirates